is a 1987 video game for the MSX2 developed by Konami, produced alongside a similarly named game for the Famicom. Both games are based on the series and story arc with the same names.

It is in essence a Knightmare-like vertical scrolling shooter with the player viewing his character on the back and enemies and obstacles entering from the top of the screen. In addition, the game's six stages are laid out in a labyrinthine way, adding puzzle elements to the mix. In order to find, reach and defeat the game's final boss, the player would have to travel back and forth between the various stages to obtain a large assortment of keys. These keys then allow access to parts of other stages, even earlier ones. This traveling between the stages is highly unusual for a shoot 'em up.

References

External links 
 

1987 video games
Japan-exclusive video games
Konami games
MSX2 games
MSX2-only games
Phoenixes in popular culture
Video games about birds
Video games based on anime and manga
Single-player video games
Video games developed in Japan